Operation White (17 November 1940) was a British attempt to deliver 14 aircraft, 12 Hawker Hurricane fighters and two Blackburn Skua dive bombers, to Malta from the old aircraft carrier . The operation was thwarted by the presence of the Italian Fleet at sea, which prompted a premature take-off of the fighters; this combined with bad weather, led to only five aircraft reaching Malta. White was one of what became known as Club Runs that supplied fighters for the defence of Malta.

Background

Malta
After the entry of Italy in the Second World War on 10 June 1940, the division of responsibility in the Mediterranean between the French Navy in the west and the British in the eastern Mediterranean ended. To compensate for the withdrawal of the French, the Admiralty established Force H at Gibraltar. The British authorities designed a formal system of aircraft reinforcement to Malta, to assemble an adequate air defence and replace potential losses. Only two routes remained open after the Battle of France, via North Africa, by shuttling the fighters through the Sahara or the Suez Canal to Egypt and by delivering them by aircraft carrier from the western Mediterranean.

Operation Hurry

On 2 August, nine Fairey Swordfish aircraft took off from Ark Royal to bomb Cagliari and three to lay mines. Royal Air Force (RAF) 418 Flight, composed of RAF pilots transferred from their squadrons and other pilots who had been attached to the Fleet Air Arm and trained for deck operations, was the first party to conduct a Club Run.

When  discovered the sailing of Force H, two lines of submarines, Scirè, Argo, Neghelli, Turchese Medusa, Axum, Diaspro and Luchio Manara were assembled on 1 August to the north of Cap Bougaroûn but the move proved abortive, with no sightings by 9 August. Three  (Italian Royal Air force) Savoia-Marchetti SM.79 medium bombers attacked Force H but Skuas from Ark Royal shot down one of the SM.79s and drove off the other two. All the British fighters reached the airstrip of Luqa at Malta, although two of the aeroplanes crash-landed. The first engagement of the new aircraft took place on the night of 13 August, when they shot down another SM.79. By 16 August, 418 Flight and the original Malta units were amalgamated into 261 Squadron.

Prelude

Force H
Following the success of Hurry, a repeat the mission was planned for in November. The convoy departed Gibraltar at dawn on 15 November. Earlier the same day, a report was passed to Somerville about the deployment of the Italian fleet south of Naples, against Force H. He decided to launch the fighters as soon as possible.

, Italian naval headquarters, was informed of the operation four hours after Force H sailed.

Operation

Given the correct cruising speed, the Hurricanes would have had 45 minutes of fuel in hand after reaching the Malta coast. They lost a third of the reserve while scrambling and forming up.

The second wave was launched an hour later, as the convoy turned back at full speed. The wind backed from south-west to south-east, hampering the eastward path of the aircraft. Near the Galite Islands, a Short Sunderland flying boat met them to lead the formation to Malta. Two Hurricanes were lost after running out of fuel at 09:08 and 09:12. One of the pilots was rescued by the Sunderland but the other was lost at sea. The four remaining Hurricanes and the Skua landed at Luqa at 09:20.

The second wave missed the Sunderland's assistance when the flying boat failed to take off from Gibraltar to escort them. They also missed the Galite Islands and a bomber sent from Malta to replace the Sunderland. One by one, the Hurricanes ran out of fuel and ditched in the sea, with the loss in all cases of pilots and aircraft. One Skua managed to crash-land near Syracuse, Sicily, just before its fuel was exhausted and after being fired upon by an anti-aircraft unit of the Italian army. The two-man crew was taken prisoner.

Aftermath
Somerville privately assessed the operation "a frightful failure". The official inquiry put the blame on the Skua crew but it was agreed that poor weather, lack of cooperation between the Navy and the RAF and the fleet's reluctance to take risks were the real cause of the fiasco. The loss of experienced fighter pilots was particularly painful. The most successful aces survived the ordeal, some of them being veterans of the Battle of Britain.

See also
 Operation Collar
 Battle of Cape Spartivento

Footnotes

References

 
 
 
 
 
 
 

White
White
White
Naval aviation operations and battles
November 1940 events